Bastian Thomas Laurits Eidem (born 31 January 1859) was a Norwegian schoolteacher and politician.

He was born in Sykkylven to farmer Johannes Bastiansen Eidem and Brit Trulsdotter. He was elected representative to the Storting for the periods 1913–1915, 1916–1918 and 1925–1927, for the Liberal Party. He served as mayor of Tromsø from 1900 to 1904, in 1906 and from 1910 to 1913. He was appointed borgermester of Tromsø from 1919 to 1926.

References

1859 births
1954 deaths
People from Sykkylven
Liberal Party (Norway) politicians
Members of the Storting
Mayors of places in Troms